Gruta do Lago Azul Natural Monument (Blue Lake Cave) is a  natural monument in Bonito, Mato Grosso do Sul, Brazil. 
It holds two caves with interesting but fragile calcareous formations, and has been listed as a protected area since 1978.

Description

Between the months of September and February the waters take on an intense blue color, for which the lake is named.
Fossil bones have been found of large mammals that inhabited the region for more than 12,000 years in the Pleistocene.
These include giant sloths, armadillos and sabre-toothed tigers.

The Gruta de Nossa Senhora Aparecida does not contain water and has little natural light.
It has a single, large hall with a sloping floor  at its widest.
The hall contains speleothems, some of which are called "angels" since they resemble humans with wings.
The Gruta de Nossa Senhora Aparecida is closed to visitors for safety reasons.

History

The Gruta do Lago Azul and the Grutas de Nossa Senhora Aparecida, both in Bonito, Mato Grosso do Sul, were listed as natural monuments in 1978 by the National Institute of Historic and Artistic Heritage (IPHAN).
The objective is to preserve the very fragile calcareous structures in the cave, the lake and its aquatic ecosystem, and the landscape around the caves.
Visitors are allowed, accompanied by guides from the municipality of Bonito.
Regulations are designed to prevent any damage to the cave.

Notes

Sources

Caves of Mato Grosso do Sul
Environmental protection areas of Brazil
Natural monuments of Brazil
1978 establishments in Brazil